Chung Chao-cheng (Hakka Chinese Pha̍k-fa-sṳ: Chûng Sau-chṳn;  20 January 1925 – 16 May 2020) was a Taiwanese Hakka writer.

Chung was born on 20 January 1925, in Longtan District, Taoyuan. Under Japanese rule, the subdivision was classified as a village by the name of Ryūtan, itself a part of Daikei, in Shinchiku Prefecture. His father was a schoolteacher and principal. Chung was sixth of ten siblings, and the only son. He learned to speak Taiwanese Hokkien at an early age, and was educated in the Japanese language. Chung taught at Longtan Elementary School until 1979, switching from Hakka to teaching in Mandarin at the request of the Kuomintang-led government. His knowledge of languages made Chung a member of the translingual generation. His first work was published in 1951, within the pages of the magazine Rambler. His first novel appeared as a serial within United Daily News, and over the course of his career, Chung published over thirty novels. His literary output also includes many essays, over 150 short stories, and more than forty works translated from Japanese. Together with his contemporary Yeh Shih-tao, the pair is known as "North Chung South Yeh." He promoted Taiwan nativist literature. Known as the doyen of Taiwanese literature, Chung's novel The Dull Ice Flower was adapted into a Golden Horse-winning film released in 1989. Chung fell the week before his death, and subsequently lapsed in and out of consciousness. He died on 16 May 2020 at home in Taoyuan.

Chung received the Order of Brilliant Star with Grand Cordon in 2000 from the Lee Teng-hui presidential administration. Lee's successor Chen Shui-bian awarded Chung the Order of Propitious Clouds with Grand Cordon in 2004. Posthumously, the Order of Brilliant Star with Special Grand Cordon was conferred upon Chung, alongside a presidential citation from Tsai Ing-wen.

See also
 List of Taiwanese authors

References

External links
 The Sound of Taiwan – Chung Chao-cheng, presented at the Taiwan International Ethnographic Film Festival

1925 births
2020 deaths
Taiwanese male novelists
Taiwanese people of Hakka descent
Hakka writers
Writers from Taoyuan City
20th-century Taiwanese writers
20th-century novelists
Taiwanese schoolteachers
20th-century short story writers
Taiwanese male short story writers
Taiwanese translators
Japanese–Chinese translators
20th-century essayists
Taiwanese essayists
National Taiwan University alumni
Male essayists
Recipients of the Order of Propitious Clouds
Recipients of the Order of Brilliant Star